Evert Pieters (11 December 1856, Amsterdam - 17 February 1932, Laren) was a Dutch painter, known primarily for landscapes and interiors.

Biography 
He was born to a poor family and was apprenticed to a house painter at an early age. At the age of nineteen, he went to Antwerp, seeking an apprenticeship with a decorative painter to improve his chances of earning a good living. While there, he also took drawing classes in the evening at the Royal Academy of Fine Arts. Eventually, he found a position with the Belgian landscape painter, Theodoor Verstraete.

He had his first successful showing at the Exposition Universelle d'Anvers (1885). He remained in Belgium as a freelance painter and won a medal at the Seconde Exposition Internationale d'Anvers in 1894 for his painting of a wheatfield in Flanders. He married shortly thereafter, dividing his time between Paris and Barbizon; concentrating on landscapes and still-lifes after the style of the old Dutch Masters. That same painting received a gold medal at the Salon two years later.

In 1895 he returned to the Netherlands and settled in Blaricum. He was not as successful there, however, and his request for membership at the Pulchri Studio was denied. Despite being married, his life took on a Bohemian quality. He began doing interiors with figures, which became popular in the United States.

Shortly after 1900, he spent time in Italy to recover from surgery. After that, his work became more Impressionistic and often included flowers. In 1905, he moved to Katwijk aan Zee and began painting beach scenes. A few years later, he moved to Laren and lived there until his sudden death during a taxi ride home from Baarn.

Personal life 
Pieters married Marie Eugenie van den Bossche (1855–1940), daughter of Jules van den Bossche and Badima on 15 October 1895 in Haarlem.

Selected paintings

References

Further reading 
 W.P.H. de Vries: De schilder Evert Pieters en zijn werk, Frans Buffa & Zonen, 1926.
 André Groeneveld, Evert Pieters, 1856-1932: zee en zand en zonnige momenten, Katwijks Museum, 2006

External links

ArtNet: More works by Pieters.

1856 births
1932 deaths
Painters from Amsterdam
19th-century Dutch painters
Dutch male painters
20th-century Dutch painters
Dutch landscape painters
19th-century Dutch male artists
20th-century Dutch male artists